Velykodolynske is an urban-type settlement in Odesa Raion of Odesa Oblast in Ukraine. Velykodolynske hosts the administration of Velykodolynske settlement hromada, one of the hromadas of Ukraine. Population:

History 
It was founded in 1803 by Odesa governor Armand-Emmanuel du Plessis de Richelieu who installed German colons (Black Sea Germans). The place was named Gross Liebenthal and had two lutheran churches. It received the name of Bolshaya Akkarzha in 1918 and its current name in 1945.

Until 18 July 2020, Velykodolynske belonged to Ovidiopol Raion. The raion was abolished in July 2020 as part of the administrative reform of Ukraine, which reduced the number of raions of Odesa Oblast to seven. The area of Ovidiopol Raion was split between Bilhorod-Dnistrovskyi and Odesa Raions, with Velykodolynske being transferred to Odesa Raion.

Economy

Transportation
There are three railway stations in the settlement, Akkarzha, Post 25 km, and Post 22 km. They are all on the railway connecting Odesa and Bilhorod-Dnistrovskyi. There is infrequent passenger traffic.

Highway H33 connecting Odesa with Bilhorod-Dnistrovskyi runs through the settlement.

References

Urban-type settlements in Odesa Raion